Kene Nwangwu (born February 9, 1998) is an American football running back for the Minnesota Vikings of the National Football League (NFL). He played college football at Iowa State.

Professional career
Nwangwu was drafted by the Minnesota Vikings in the fourth round, 119th overall, of the 2021 NFL Draft. On May 15, 2021, he signed his rookie contract with Minnesota, worth $4.23 million with a $752K signing bonus. He was placed on injured reserve on September 1, 2021. He was activated on October 19. His first NFL touchdown was a 98 yard kick-off return for a touchdown versus the Baltimore Ravens in Week 9, earning NFC Special Teams Player of the Week. Three weeks later in Week 12 against the San Francisco 49ers, Nwangwu returned another kick for a touchdown, this one being 99 yards.

On Thanksgiving night 2022, in Week 12 against the New England Patriots, he had another kickoff return for a 97 yard touchdown, earning NFC Special Teams Player of the Week.

References

External links
 Minnesota Vikings bio
 Iowa State Cyclones bio

1998 births
Living people
Players of American football from Texas
Sportspeople from the Dallas–Fort Worth metroplex
People from Frisco, Texas
American football running backs
Iowa State Cyclones football players
Minnesota Vikings players